is a paralympic athlete from Japan competing mainly in category T36 sprint events.

Kikuchi competed in both the 100m and 200m in the 2004 Summer Paralympics picking up the bronze medal in the T26 200m.

References

Paralympic athletes of Japan
Athletes (track and field) at the 2004 Summer Paralympics
Paralympic bronze medalists for Japan
Living people
Medalists at the 2004 Summer Paralympics
Year of birth missing (living people)
Paralympic medalists in athletics (track and field)
Japanese female sprinters
21st-century Japanese women